Baħrija is a village in Rabat, Malta, with a low population density. The name Baħrija means moth in Maltese. It is also known in English as Baħria, of which the Counts Moscati had owned the fiefdom that was granted by the Grand Master of Malta.

Overview
Two churches are present in Baħrija, an old one (which was re-inaugurated on Saturday 19 October 2013), and the newer church, built in 1984, which is dedicated to Saint Martin of Tours and which is currently in use.

The main feast in Baħrija is that of Saint Martin of Tours, which is celebrated annually on 11 November. This feast is associated with an old tradition where a bag full of an assortment of nuts, sweets and fresh fruit is given to young children on the day.

Another tradition present exclusively in Baħrija is the annual fair which is held on the Sunday before the feast, where an assortment of goods are given away in a number of lotteries.

Baħrija is also famous for its rabbit cooking restaurants.

Bahrija is one of the highest places in Malta, therefore the weather here is cooler than that of the lower land (it is also exposed to the cold northern winds coming over the sea). Most of the north of Malta is visible from this village, but the south west of Gozo (including Xlendi) is also visible, and on clear still nights, a line of street lights is visible on the horizon to the north, where Sicily is.

Although Bahrija has little rich soil, much of its land is used for agriculture, mostly growing grape vines and other common fruit that can withstand the harsh heat of the summer and the lack of soil.

Bahrija is a good place to search for walks. For a cliff climb, there is the Fomm ir-Rih walk, or for Maltese heritage, the Victoria lines start at Kuncizzjoni.

Baħrija's zones
Fomm ir-Riħ
Il-Misraħ
Iż-Żinżla
Kunċizzjoni
Ta' Fantin
Ta' Gerżuma
Ta' Namura
Ta' Sirena
Tal-Marġa
Ras ir-Raħeb
Wied Gerżuma
Wied il-Baħrija
Wied iż-Żebbuġ
Wied Rini
Wied tal-Marġa

Baħrija Main Roads
Triq Fomm ir-Riħ (Fomm ir-Riħ Road)
Triq il-Palazz (Palace Street)
Triq is-Sajf ta' San Martin (St Martin's Summer Street)
Triq L-Imtaħleb (Mtaħleb Road)

Further reading
Bahrija Heritage

Populated places in Malta
Rabat, Malta